Rutgers is a Dutch patronymic surname (Rutger's). Notable people with the surname include:

An Rutgers van der Loeff (1910–1990), Dutch writer of children's novels
Arend Joan Rutgers (1903–1998), Dutch physical chemist
Bram Rutgers (1884–1966), Dutch politician, Governor of Suriname 1928–33
Henry Rutgers (1745–1830), American Revolutionary War hero and philanthropist. Named for him are, a.o.:
Rutgers Houses, New York City public housing development
Rutgers Preparatory School and Rutgers University, New Jersey schools
Rutgers Presbyterian Church, New York City church
Rutgers Street and Henry Street, New York City streets
 (1850–1924), Dutch physician, significant figure in the Dutch sexual liberation movement. Named for him: 
Rutgers Nisso Group, Dutch expert centre on sexuality
Rutgers World Population Foundation, Dutch population concern organization
Mietje Rutgers-Hoitsema (1847–1934), Dutch feminist, wife of Jan Rutgers
Paul Rutgers (born 1984), Australian/South African baseball player
S. J. Rutgers (1879–1961), Dutch Marxist theoretician and journalist, son of Jan and Mietje Rutgers
 (1877–1945), Dutch jurist, Minister of Education, and World War II resistance fighter
Adopted as a middle name
Henry Rutgers Marshall (1852–1927), American architect and psychologist
Peter Beckford Rutgers Vanneck (1922–1999), British Royal Navy officer, fighter pilot, and Mayor of London

See also 
Hildegard Rütgers (born 1932), German classical contralto singer

References

Dutch-language surnames
Patronymic surnames